Paraonidae is a family of polychaetes belonging to the order Cirratulida.

Genera

Genera:
 Aedicira Hartman, 1957
 Aparaonis Hartman, 1965
 Aricidea Webster, 1879

References

Polychaetes